Konstantin Georgiyevich Zuyev (born 17 November 1981) is a Russian former professional footballer.

Club career
He made his debut in the Russian Premier League in 2001 for FC Chernomorets Novorossiysk. He played one game in the UEFA Cup 2001–02 for FC Chernomorets Novorossiysk.

References

1981 births
People from Pavlodar
Living people
Russian footballers
Association football midfielders
FC Zhemchuzhina Sochi players
FC Chernomorets Novorossiysk players
FC Saturn Ramenskoye players
FC Kuban Krasnodar players
FC Rostov players
FC Anzhi Makhachkala players
FC Nizhny Novgorod (2007) players
FC SKA-Khabarovsk players
FC Tyumen players
Russian Premier League players
FC Dynamo Makhachkala players